The Archdiocese for the Military Services, USA (formally the Military Ordinariate of the United States of America) is an ecclesiastical jurisdiction of the Catholic Church in the United States that provides the Catholic Church's pastoral and spiritual services to those serving in the armed forces of the United States and their dependents and to all military and naval bases, to the facilities of the Veterans Administration, and to other federal services overseas. It is canonically a military ordinariate, headed by a bishop.

It was originally established as a military vicariate, with the Archbishop of New York serving as the military vicar. It was reorganized as an archdiocese, with its own archbishop and its see geographically relocated to the District of Columbia by Pope John Paul II in 1986. While the archdiocese is a Latin Church jurisdiction, clergy from the Eastern Catholic Churches may receive endorsement by the archdiocese, on the condition that they maintain bi-ritual faculties and can celebrate the sacraments in the ordinary form of the Roman Rite.

The current diocesan bishop is Archbishop Timothy P. Broglio.  He is assisted by several auxiliary bishops.  Together, they oversee Catholic priests serving as chaplains throughout the world. Each chaplain remains incardinated into the diocese or religious institute for which he was ordained.

The Archdiocese for the Military Services, USA is a personal jurisdiction, meaning that it has no defined territory and that its jurisdiction extends to those whom it serves throughout the world. It has jurisdiction wherever American men and women in uniform serve. The jurisdiction of the Archdiocese extends to all United States government property in the United States and abroad, including U.S. military installations, embassies, consulates and other diplomatic missions.

History

Prior to the creation of the Military Ordinariate and then the Archdiocese for the Military Services, the armed forces of the United States was served by an informal corps of volunteer priests. Beginning in 1917, the spiritual care of those in military service fell to the Military Vicariate, the equivalent of a personal vicariate apostolic, that is, a particular church the membership of which is defined by some personal quality (as in this case being a member or a dependent of a member of the armed services) that is headed by a legate of the pope. Originally, the ordinariate was headed by then-Bishop Patrick Hayes, an auxiliary bishop of the Archdiocese of New York who served double duty as papal military vicar for the United States beginning on November 24, 1917.

Hayes was chosen because New York was the primary port of embarkation for U.S. troops leaving for Europe and therefore a convenient contact point for Catholic chaplains serving with them. When Cardinal John Farley, Archbishop of New York, died, Hayes was appointed as his successor and kept the additional title and duty of military vicar. In November 1939, the Holy See established the Military Vicariate of the United States of America. The post remained an additional duty of the archbishop of New York from Hayes' time until Cardinal Terence Cooke began plans to separate it as its own jurisdiction in the early 1980s, plans he was unable to carry out before his death in 1983. Cardinal John Joseph O'Connor—a retired Navy chaplain with the rank of Rear Admiral, having served as chief of Navy chaplains (the military's title for its own senior chaplain officer) subsequently served as an auxiliary bishop for the Military Vicariate. He succeeded Cardinal Cooke as Archbishop of New York and Apostolic Administrator of the Military Vicariate.  He oversaw the completion of the transition.  On July 21, 1986, Pope John Paul II reconstituted the military vicariate as the present Archdiocese for the Military Services, USA, naming Archbishop Joseph T. Ryan its first archbishop.

In 2012, Catholic Extension approved a $56,000 two year grant to the Archdiocese for the Military Services to support faith formation programs for Catholics in the United States military. As of April 2013, about 25% of the U.S. armed forces are Catholic.

As of 2017, the Archdiocese had 208 priests on active duty serving approximately 1.8 million people.

Bishops
The lists of bishops, archbishops and auxiliary bishops and their tenure of service:

Apostolic Vicar of the United States Armed Forces
 Cardinal Patrick Joseph Hayes (1917-1938), concurrently served as Auxiliary Bishop of New York and later Archbishop of New York
 Cardinal Francis Joseph Spellman (1939-1967), concurrently served as Archbishop of New York
 Cardinal Terence James Cooke (1968-1983), concurrently served as Archbishop of New York

Apostolic Delegate for the United States Armed Forces
 John Francis O'Hara, C.S.C. (1939-1945), appointed Bishop of Buffalo and later Archbishop of Philadelphia (elevated to Cardinal in 1958)
 William Richard Arnold (1945-1965)

Archbishop for the Military Services, USA
 John Joseph Thomas Ryan (1985-1991)
 Joseph Thomas Dimino (1991-1997)
 Edwin Frederick O'Brien (1997-2007), appointed Archbishop of Baltimore and later Pro-Grand Master and Grand Master of the Order of the Holy Sepulchre (elevated to Cardinal in 2012)
 Timothy P. Broglio (2008–present)

Coadjutor Archbishops
 John Joseph Thomas Ryan (1975-1985)
 Edwin Frederick O'Brien (1997)

Auxiliary Bishops

 William Tibertus McCarty, C.Ss.R. (1943–1947), appointed Bishop of Rapid City
 James Henry Ambrose Griffiths (1949–1955), concurrently served as Auxiliary Bishop of New York
 Philip Joseph Furlong (1955–1971)
 William Joseph Moran (1965–1981)
 James Jerome Killeen (1975–1978)
 John Joseph O'Connor (1979–1983), appointed Bishop of Scranton and later Archbishop of New York (elevated to Cardinal in 1985)
 Lawrence Joyce Kenney (1983–1990)
 Angelo Thomas Acerra, O.S.B. (1983–1990)
 Joseph Thomas Dimino (1983–1991), appointed Archbishop for the Military Services, USA
 Francis Xavier Roque (1983–2004)
 John Gavin Nolan (1987–1997)
 John Joseph Glynn (1991–2002)
 José de Jesús Madera Uribe, M.Sp.S. (1991–2004)
 John Joseph Kaising (2000–2007)
 Joseph W. Estabrook (2004–2012)
 Richard Brendan Higgins (2004–2020)
 F. Richard Spencer (2010–present)
 Neal James Buckon (2011–present)
 Robert J. Coyle (2013–2018), appointed Auxiliary Bishop of Rockville Centre
 Joseph L. Coffey (2019–present)
 William Muhm (2019–present)

Seat
The diocesan chancery is located in Washington, D.C. The Archdiocese for the Military Services is the only US diocese without a cathedral, but celebrates its major functions at the Basilica of the National Shrine of the Immaculate Conception.

Noncombatant status

The Geneva Conventions state (Protocol I, June 8, 1977, Art 43.2) that chaplains are noncombatants: they do not have the right to participate directly in hostilities. Captured chaplains are not considered Prisoners of War (Third Convention, August 12, 1949, Chapter IV Art 33) and must be returned to their home nation unless retained to minister to prisoners of war.

Reports of sexual abuse

Army
In 1985. Catholic US Army chaplain Alvin L. Campbell plead guilty to sex abuse and received a 14 year prison sentence. He served 7 years of this sentence and was removed from public ministry.  He died in 2002.

In 2000, Catholic army chaplain Mark Matson was convicted and sentenced to 20 years in prison for molesting a 13 year old boy while serving at a US Army hospital.

In 2005, Catholic chaplain Gregory Arflack was sentenced to five years in prison after pleading guilty to sexually assaulting members of the US Army.

Air Force
In 1991, US Air Force priest Thomas Chleboski pled guilty to five counts of molesting a 13 year old boy in 1989 and received a 20 year prison sentence. He was accused of luring his victim with tours of Andrews Air Force Base.

Barry Ryan, who served two years in prison for separate acts of sex abuse he committed in 2003, was removed from the archdiocese in 1995 after allegations surfaced that he committed acts of sex abuse against a minor in 1994.

On April 12, 2019, Arthur Perrault, a former Roman Catholic priest who served as a US Air Force chaplain, was found guilty of sexually abusing an altar boy at an Air Force base and a veterans' cemetery in New Mexico in the early 1990s. On September 15, 2019, Perrault, who was extradited in September 2018 years after he fled the country, received a 30 year prison sentence. Perrault was serving in the Air National Guard when the abuse took place.

Notable chaplains by conflict

Mexican–American War
 John McElroy, S.J. – One of two of the Army's first Catholic chaplains. Founder of Boston College.
 Anthony Rey, S.J. – One of two of the Army's first Catholic chaplains. Vice president of Georgetown College (1845). First Catholic chaplain killed during service with the U.S. military.

Civil War
For Civil War chaplains, see footnote
 Emmeran M. Bliemel, OSB – He was the first Catholic chaplain killed in action during the Civil War.
 William Corby – He is famous for giving a general absolution to the Irish Brigade at the Battle of Gettysburg.
 John Ireland – He served as a chaplain of the 5th Minnesota Volunteer Infantry Regiment.
 Bernard John McQuaid – He volunteered as a chaplain and accompanied the New Jersey Brigade to the seat of war, during which service he was captured by the Confederates.

Spanish–American War
 John P. Chidwick – A priest of the Archdiocese of New York and the third Catholic chaplain in the history of the Navy, he was the chaplain on USS Maine when it was destroyed by an explosion on February 15, 1898 (which led to the Spanish–American War of April 8 to August 13, 1898); he helped coordinate the burial of sailors and their later reburials at Arlington National Cemetery

World War I
 John B. DeValles
 Francis P. Duffy – Chaplain for the 69th Infantry Regiment (a military unit from New York City and part of the New York Army National Guard) – known as "The Fighting 69th" – which had been federalized and redesignated the 165th U.S. Infantry Regiment.
 John Joseph Mitty – In 1919, he was assigned as Catholic chaplain at the U.S. Military Academy; during his tenure at West Point, General Douglas MacArthur served as superintendent.
 Colman O'Flaherty – Chaplain with the 1st Infantry Division; was killed in action, in France; posthumously awarded the Distinguished Service Cross.
 Barry O'Toole

World War II

See footnote
 William R. Arnold (first Catholic Army Chief of Chaplains; later served as Apostolic Vicar for the U.S.Armed Forces)
 Thomas J. Barrett 
 Frederic P. Gehring, C.M.
  Joseph Gilmore 
 William Guilfoyle 
 Philip M. Hannan
 William A. Irwin a
 Alfred W. Johnson
 Francis J. McManus
 Joseph T. O'Callahan – served on USS Franklin; awarded the Medal of Honor
 James Hugh O'Neill – wrote the Patton weather prayer; awarded the Bronze Star Medal once the weather cleared and later served as the Deputy Chief of Chaplains of the United States Army
 John A. Ryan
 Joseph T. Ryan
 Aloysius H. Schmitt – first US chaplain to die in WW II; on USS Oklahoma
 William J. Walsh - Air Force Catholic Chaplain Said the first Mass since the 5th century in Greenland in 1942. He was a priest of the Archdiocese of St. Paul.
 John P. Washington – one of the Four Chaplains
 Joseph Verbis Lafleur, recipient of the Distinguished Service Cross, Bronze Star, and Purple Heart

Korean War

See footnote
 Herman G. Felhoelter – chaplain with the 19th Infantry Regiment, 24th Infantry Division; executed, along with 30 critically wounded soldiers; posthumously awarded the Distinguished Service Cross
 Emil J. Kapaun – chaplain with 8th Cavalry Regiment, 1st Cavalry Division. Captured by Chinese forces at the Battle of Unsan, November 1-2, 1950. Continued his priestly ministry among American POWs, including speaking out against Communist indoctrination and stealing food and medicine. Died in captivity on May 23, 1951; posthumously awarded the Medal of Honor in 2013. Declared a Servant of God in 1993, Fr. Kapaun's cause for canonization as a Saint began in 2008. In 2022, Catholic officials raised the possibility that Fr. Kapaun died a martyr for the Catholic faith, which would hasten the process of canonization.
 Dennis Murphy
 John J. O'Connor (later served as Navy Chief of Chaplains, 1975–1979, and as  auxiliary bishop of the Military Vicariate, 1979–1983)

Cold War (pre-Vietnam)
 Terence P. Finnegan (first Catholic Air Force Chief of Chaplains)
 Patrick J. Ryan (second Catholic Army Chief of Chaplains)

Vietnam War
See footnote
 Robert R. Brett, S.M. – killed during Tet offensive, after declining his seat on a departing helicopter
 Vincent R. Capodanno, M.M. – awarded the Medal of Honor posthumously
 Edwin R. Chess (second Catholic Air Force Chief of Chaplains)
 John F. Laboon, Jr., S.J.
 Charles Liteky
 Francis L. Sampson (third Catholic Army Chief of Chaplains)
 Charles J. Watters – awarded the Medal of Honor posthumously

Cold War (post-Vietnam)
 John A. Collins (fourth Catholic Air Force Chief of Chaplains)
 William Joseph Dendinger (seventh Catholic Air Force Chief of Chaplains)
 Patrick J. Hessian (fourth Catholic Army Chief of Chaplains)
 John P. McDonough (fifth Catholic Air Force Chief of Chaplains)
 Henry J. Meade (third Catholic Air Force Chief of Chaplains)
 Donald W. Shea (fifth Catholic Army Chief of Chaplains)
 Arthur S. Thomas (sixth Catholic Air Force Chief of Chaplains)

Iraq War/War on Terror
 Donald L. Rutherford (sixth Catholic Army Chief of Chaplains)
 H. Timothy Vakoc – only US chaplain to die from wounds received during the Iraq War

Fiction and literature portraying Catholic military chaplains

 The Fighting 69th
 The Longest Day (book)
 The Longest Day (film)
 MASH: A Novel About Three Army Doctors
 MASH (film)
 M*A*S*H (TV series)

See also

 Chaplain Assistant (Army)
 Chaplain of the Coast Guard
 Chaplain of the United States Marine Corps
 Chaplain's Medal for Heroism
 Insignia of Chaplain Schools in the US Military
 International Military Chiefs of Chaplains Conference
 List of Catholic bishops of the United States: Archdiocese for the Military Services
 National Catholic Community Service
 National Catholic Welfare Council
 New Testament military metaphors
 Religious Program Specialist (Navy)
 Religious symbolism in the United States military
 United States Air Force Chaplain Corps
 United States Army Chaplain Corps
 United States military chaplains
 United States Navy Chaplain Corps
 U.S. Army Chaplain Museum – includes link to historic photographs of Army chaplains in World War I, World War II, the Korean War, and the Vietnam War

Footnotes

Further reading

Books

 Crosby, Donald F., 1994. Battlefield Chaplains: Catholic Priests in World War II. Lawrence, Kansas: University Press of Kansas. 
 O'Brien, Steve. Blackrobe in Blue: The Naval Chaplaincy of John P. Foley, S.J. 1942-1946 (see external link, below)
 O'Rahilly, Alfred. The Padre of Trench Street (about Jesuit Father William Doyle). 
 O'Malley, Mark Francis. An History of the Development of Catholic Military Chaplaincy in the United States. Gregorian University, 2009 (dissertation).

Internet
 
 
 
 . Fr. Dan Farley is a fifteen-year veteran of the U.S. Army chaplain corps. He retired as a chaplain and returned to St. Maximilian Kolbe Parish in Portage County, Wisconsin, in the Diocese of La Crosse, in June 2009.
 Daigle, Fr. David, "Snapshot of a shipmate: LTJG Philip Johnson", Catholic News Agency, Washington D.C., June 21, 2008. Retrieved 2009-09-13.
 "Vicar General for the Diocese of Fargo to return to active duty", Catholic News Agency, Fargo, N.D., February 11, 2008. Retrieved 2009-09-13.
 "Chaplains are entrusted with spreading Gospel of peace in military, Pope says", Catholic News Agency, Vancouver, Canada, October 26, 2006. Retrieved 2009-09-13.
 "Colombian priest to provide chaplain services to Hispanic US troops in Iraq", Catholic News Agency, Orlando, Fla., June 8, 2006. Retrieved 2009-09-13.

External links
 Archdiocese for the Military Services, USA, official website
 Archdiocese for the Military Services of the United States. GCatholic.org
 Military Ordinariate of United States of America, Military. David M. Cheney (Catholic-Hierarchy.org)
 Mission Capodanno website (Catholics in the Military; serving personnel, chaplains and families of those in the U.S. military)
 Global Catholic Statistics: 1905 and Today by Albert J. Fritsch, SJ, PhD
 Organizational Profile – National Center for Charitable Statistics (Urban Institute)

+
Catholic Church in Washington, D.C.
Religion in the United States military
United States military chaplaincy
United States military support organizations
United S
Military Services, USA
Military Services, USA
Military Services, USA
1957 establishments in the United States